Lady Macbeth of the Mtsensk District is a 1989 Soviet drama film directed by Roman Balayan, based on the eponymous novella by Nikolai Leskov.

Plot
Katerina Izmailova is a beautiful wife of a rich merchant who does not marry out of love. Katerina, who for days on end suffering from idleness, gets herself a young lover, Sergei. Soon their relationship progresses to the fact that they are forced to kill her husband Katerina, who discovers infidelity, and this is only the first step to their deadly unity.

Cast
Natalya Andrejchenko - Katerina Izmailova
Aleksandr Abdulov - Sergey
Nikolai Pastukhov - Zinovy Borisovich
Tatyana Kravchenko - Aksinya
Oleg Ilyukhin - Fedya
Elena Kolchugina - Sonnetka
Natalia Potapova - Fiona

References

External links

Soviet drama films
Films based on works by Nikolai Leskov
Films based on Russian novels
1989 drama films
1989 films